Jamie Plunkett is a former Professional Lacrosse player with the Boston Rockhoppers, Arizona Sting and Hershey Haymakers of the National Lacrosse league and the North American Lacrosse League. He currently is Coaching SCC-BLAX in Berlin. He is also the Co-Founder for the Deutschland Adler Lacrosse Club, which is the Unofficial National indoor lacrosse team in Germany.

Czech National Lacrosse team:
Plunkett has twice played with the Czech National Lacrosse Team. The first time is 2011 at the World Indoor Lacrosse Championships in Prague, where he led his team to a 4th-place finish, losing to USA in the Bronze medal game. The second time was 2012 at the European Lacrosse Championships where he once again led his team in Scoring.

Now Jamie has been named as an assistant coach with Turkey Lacrosse Association for the World Lacrosse Championships in Denver July 10–19.

References

Living people
American lacrosse players
Year of birth missing (living people)